Muyiwa Olarewaju  (born 26 November) is a British Gospel singer and songwriter who mixes traditional gospel music with elements of world music (from Africa, the Caribbean and Asia), soul, R&B and pop. He is also an experienced performer, broadcaster and presenter. In 2009 he became the first-ever international act to perform on America's popular entertainment channel, BET, for the prestigious annual Celebration of Gospel show. He has presented the Turning Point programme to an estimated global audience of 70 million. With his group Riversongz, he sold out Indigo2 at the O2 in London, the first gospel act to do so, and he has played at the largest gospel music event in the world, The Experience, attracting a 500,000 strong audience.

Broadcast/presenter career
As a broadcaster Muyiwa has for the last 10 years presented on Premier Radio's flagship programmes Gospel Tonight and Worship Tonight, to an audience of 500,000 listeners. Muyiwa has also, for the last five years, held the position of station director of Premier Gospel, the number-one Gospel music station in the UK, boasting a listenership of 180,000 a month.

Muyiwa is the Host of the Turning Point television show, a vibrant programme with a global audience reach of 70 million.

Lufthansa Airlines is the home of Sounds Of Africa, a radio show hosted by Muyiwa for the last seven years. Muyiwa is also the host of Jewels of Africa, a television show aired on Kenya Airways and Namibia Airlines.

Muyiwa has appeared as judge for numerous events; of these he has featured as celebrity judge for five seasons on the BBC Songs of Praise, Gospel Choir of the Year Competition.

Personal life 
Born in London, he lived for the first few years of his life in Nigeria with his headmaster father – whom he calls "the giant of my life" – and his radio broadcaster mother. His earliest musical memories in Nigeria are of listening to, not R&B but church music and Kate Bush.

“A lot of people think of West Africans as like black Americans," he says, "but we're more likely to listen to Fela Kuti, Dylan, Kate Bush – a variety of stuff.”

When he was nine, he and his brothers and sisters – the former now a gospel singer and broadcaster in Nigeria, the latter respectively a preacher and IT expert – were sent to live with a series of friends and family in London, so that they could receive a better education. The first place he lived was Stamford Hill, with an uncle.

“It was a horrid experience," he shudders. "The cold hit me upside my head. My uncle said to me, 'You're going to suffer here.' I thought, 'Whoa, what's this?' I had none of the comforts of parental guidance and cover. I was just a burden to these people. I felt lost.” He remembers another time, in between homes, crying in Borough High Street, his belongings spilling out of his bag onto the pavement. He wound up living with a different, distant uncle, "a young Nigerian guy, very flashy and a druggy", who made Muyiwa feel physically imperilled. “I lived there for a couple of years," he recalls. "But I didn't beg my mum to take me back – it wasn't part of the culture, to challenge the wisdom of adults.” This period in his life was, he admits, "traumatic – I felt like I was in a daze". He was tempted to go the druggy route, even to become a male escort. But he knew how much trouble he would have got into with his parents back in Nigeria, so he kept to the straight and narrow. In fact, around this time, Muyiwa discovered the church. He describes it as the only constant in his life – "even amid the chaos of our home lives". This was his introduction to gospel music. "Before that," he explains, "it was all hymns. It was a revelation. I could feel the energy of the music. The church had loads of Africans in and I felt like I was part of a family.”

Living a more settled life with his older sister in a council flat in Forest Gate, he taught himself piano. He left Brixton's Archbishop Tennyson School in 1988, then took a BTEC National Diploma in Business and Finance, after being in awe of the marketing executives in the church. He proceeded to take an HND in Business Studies at East London University and a Music Degree at Westminster University.

Muyiwa and Riversongz 
Muyiwa is the Leader of Riversongz. As a collective they have toured with Stevie Wonder and individually have worked with a variety of artists, from Emelie Sandy and Pixie Lot to Amy Winehouse. Muyiwa & Riversongz made history in 2009 as the first international artists to appear on the American BET channel at the annual "Celebration of Gospel".

Muyiwa and Riversongs have as their history tours and performances across the UK, Europe and America. Amongst these are their “sold out dates” at venues in the UK such as Ocean Hackney, Indigo 02, and Eventim Apollo.

Muyiwa & Riversongz have released five albums — Restoration (2003); Declaring His Power (2005), recorded at the Liverpool Lighthouse Liverpool Lighthouse, the UK's first dedicated Urban Gospel arts centre; Declaring His Love (2008), recorded at the Ocean music venue in Hackney (now picture house), the album staying at number 1 on HMV's Jazz & Blues chart for five months; Live at the O2 (2010) as the first UK gospel group to sell out the Indigo 2 venue; and Declaring His Name All Around The World (2012) an album that features singers from India, China, Africa and Stellar and Dove Award-nominated artist Darwin Hobbs, an American gospel music singer noted for his vocal similarity to classic soul singer Luther Vandross. The album also features Mary Alessi, twin sister of Martha Munizzi, The album was produced by Grammy and Stellar Award-winning producer Kevin Bond. The album was number 5 on Amazon's World Music Best sellers charts.

The live DVD recording at the O2 in 2012 was a landmark moment for UK gospel with guest performances from house music legend Kym 
Mazelle, Saxophonist and Broadcaster Yolanda Browne. The evening was hosted by award-winning British comedian Eddie Kadi. In the audience was a cross section of high-profile names including a few that were part of the evenings recording like actor Nonso Anozie (Jack Ryan:Shadow Recruit, 7 Days in Entebbe). Celebrated British Actor Rudolph Walker CBE (Patrick in Eastenders) was also a part of the DVD recording.

The Eko Ile Album released in 2015 was produced by the Ghanaian musician, guitarist, keyboardist, producer, recording- engineer and multi-instrumentalist. Kwame Yeboah. Recorded mostly at the Mixstation studios in Accra Ghana and the rest in Riversongz Studios in London. The critically acclaimed album saw Muyiwa perform on BBC 1 Sunday Morning Live hosted by Naga Munchetty and guests that included Esther Röntgen & Neil Wallis. The Live DVD recording of the album was at Transformation House in Clapham Junction

In 2017 Muyiwa released the No One Like you album a compilation of already released songs with s special composition featuring the energetic philanthropist and Pastor Reverend Mother Esther Abimbola Ajayi. The album was a special release for the comforter conference hosted by Reverend Ester at the Excel Conference center in London.

Muyiwa & Riversongz featured in both BBC Proms gospel Night and headlined the night in 2013 edition and also 2016 along with Michelle Williams of Destinys Childs  at the Royal Albert Hall.

Olarewaju was appointed Officer of the Order of the British Empire (OBE) in the 2020 Birthday Honours for services to music.

Discography
Albums:
Muyiwa & Riversongz: Live at the Apollo (2012): a CD and DVD project recorded live before a sold-out audience at London's prestigious Eventim Apollo.
Declaring His Name All Around the World (2011): the first studio album from Muyiwa & Riversongz, produced by the Grammy Award-winning Kevin Bond, hit No. 5 on Amazon's World Music Charts.
Declaring His Love (2008): recorded Live in London in 2007 at the Ocean Hackney to a sold-out audience, Declaring His Love reached No. 1 on the HMV Jazz & Blues Charts and remained there for five months. The release of the project was followed by a 10-city sold-out UK tour.
Declaring His Power (2005): Recorded live in Andfield at the Liverpool Football Grounds, this album release licensed to Kingsway Music was followed by a SOLD OUT ten city UK tour.
Restoration (2002): Muyiwa & Riversongz's debut album restoration, recorded in 2002 before a live audience in London, England. It featured an all-star band including Steve Turner, (Kylie Monogue), Andrew Smith MD (West Life), Chris Brown (Kylie Monogue) and Julian Brown (Jason Donovan).
Eko Ile (2015)
No One Like You (2017)

Live DVDs
Muyiwa & Riversongz: Live at the Apollo (2012)
Declaring His Love (2008)
Declaring His Power (2005)
Restoration (2002)
Awards

See also 
British Black Gospel

References

External links 
 Official Website

1970 births
Living people
British radio presenters
British gospel singers
English people of Nigerian descent
English people of Yoruba descent
Officers of the Order of the British Empire
Yoruba musicians
Musicians from London